Lycée Saint-Exupéry, nicknamed Saint-Ex, is a sixth-form college/senior high school in the 15th arrondissement of Marseille, France.

 the attendance zone of Saint-Exupéry covers those of nine different junior high schools (collèges).

History
It began construction in 1957, when there was a "baby boom" in the Marseille area. It was originally called Lycée Nord.

In 2013 Sylvia Zappi of Le Monde described the school as a "lycée ghetto", saying that staff members used that name.

That year former teacher Franck Baillot stated that only poor families attend the school; Zappi stated that wealthier families in the area tried their best to make sure their children did not attend the school.  40% of residents in the high school attendance zone who apply to go to sixth-form/senior high through the  procedure were assigned to Saint-Exupéry, but the school only received 19% of the students who could have applied, based on previous year attendance in the corresponding high school zone.

 80 female students, making up about 5% of the student body, remove veils before going to classes.

Teachers went on strike in 2016.

Campus
It includes a boarding (internat) facility.

In 2008 a new wing was added to the building.

References

Further reading
  Sur les traces de nos pas, mémoire du quartier entre Saint-André et Saint-Antoine, Lucienne Brun, éditions Consolat Mirabeau Services, 2008,.

External links
 Lycée Saint-Exupéry 

15th arrondissement of Marseille
Lycées in Marseille